Ridley Road Market (known locally as Ridley Road) but often referred to as "Dalston Market" is the central marketplace in Dalston in the London Borough of Hackney. It is opposite Dalston Kingsland railway station, just off the Kingsland High Street section of the A10, about three miles north of the City of London. It sells a wide range of commodities, including food. Goods, particularly fruit and vegetables, are sold from traditional barrows (trolleys) in the pedestrianised street from 8am to 6pm daily (not Sundays or bank holidays). There is a large range of traditional and exotic produce from around the world. Other stalls and many other shops lining the street sell a wide variety of foods and household goods. New style stalls have recently been introduced by the local council.

See also
 List of markets in London

References 

Retail markets in London
Streets in the London Borough of Hackney

Dalston